Jamal Ray Charles (born 24 November 1995) is a Grenadian footballer who plays as a midfielder for C.D. Real Sociedad and the Grenada national football team.

Early life
Jamal Ray Charles is the son of Janice Charles and Raphael "Ray" Charles, a former footballer. As a child he attended the Belair Government School in St. Andrew's, which he represented at Primary School level competitions. At the age of 12 he entered the St. Andrew's Anglican Secondary School and was selected by coach Michael "Niko" Felix to represent the school. He played during his entire six years at that institution.

Career

Club
In July 2019 Charles signed with Liga Nacional club Real España. In December 2020 he was loaned to fellow Liga side Real Sociedad.

In May 2021 Charles returned to Grenada and joined local side Paradise.

International
Charles represented Grenada at U20 level, during 2015 CONCACAF U-20 Championship qualifying and scored 2 goals against Dominica.

Charles was first selected to represent Grenada during the 2015 Windward Islands Tournament in Saint Lucia. He made an immediate impact, scoring a brace against hosts St Lucia. Charles would score another important goal for Grenada during second round qualifying for the 2018 FIFA World Cup when he scored the winning aggregate goal against Puerto Rico in a 2–0 win to send them through to the Third Round.

International goals
As of match played 7 June 2022. Grenada score listed first, score column indicates score after each Charles goal.

References

External links
 
 
 

1995 births
Living people
Grenadian footballers
Grenadian expatriate footballers
Grenada international footballers
Liga Nacional de Fútbol Profesional de Honduras players
C.D.S. Vida players
Place of birth missing (living people)
Real Monarchs players
USL Championship players
W Connection F.C. players
Real C.D. España players
2021 CONCACAF Gold Cup players
Expatriate footballers in Trinidad and Tobago
Expatriate footballers in Honduras
Expatriate soccer players in the United States
Grenadian expatriate sportspeople in Trinidad and Tobago
Grenadian expatriate sportspeople in Honduras
Grenadian expatriate sportspeople in the United States
Association football midfielders